Meadowridge School (also known as MDR), located in Maple Ridge, British Columbia, is a coeducational, independent school teaching Junior Kindergarten through to Grade 12.

Meadowridge School's mission is "learning to live well, with others and for others, in a just community". Although consistently placing within the top three schools according to the Fraser Report, Meadowridge School Headmaster has publicly denounced the Fraser Report rankings. Meadowridge School received the 2014 Maple Ridge Chamber of Commerce Business of the Year Award.

Campus
Meadowridge School is on 27 acres of land in east Maple Ridge, British Columbia, Canada, approximately 45 minutes from Vancouver, BC. The Meadowridge Campus consists of 125,000 square feet of indoor learning space as well as a variety of outdoor learning spaces.

Indoor and outdoor learning spaces include:
 Exploration forest with a creek, trails, and bridges
 Garden area with plots for students and staff to use for a variety of subjects
 Primary Years Greenhouse
 Senior Greenhouse outfitted with variable lighting, watering system, and temperature control
 Beehives
 Two main playgrounds and one fenced playground
 Two playing fields, including a lighted Olympic sized soccer pitch
 Rubberized starting track
 Shot-Put pit
 Long-jump pit
 Library with over 40,000 resources
 Double gymnasium
 Indoor bouldering wall
 Two music rooms
 Two art rooms, one with a kiln
 Fitness facility
 More than Five science laboratories
 Design Lab with a 3D printer, laser engraver, multiple carpentry tools, and robotics kits
 Purposely built Early Learning Centre for Kindergarten and Junior Kindergarten

The creek on Meadowridge land is Latimer Creek, which the school has worked at restoring to its natural space and encouraging growth of indigenous plants and animals. With help from local agencies the Alouette River Management Society, Kanaka Education and Environmental Partnership, and the South Coast Conservation Program students and staff removed invasive plants, created a special frog pond habitat to support the endangered red-legged-frogs found in the area, and planted indigenous plants like Douglas Fir, big leaf maple, and red elderberry.

Academics
Meadowridge School abides by the British Columbia Ministry of Education curriculum while offering the International Baccalaureate program at all grade levels.
The International Baccalaureate focuses "on teaching students to think critically and independently, and how to inquire with care and logic"

Meadowridge was first authorized for the Primary Years Programme (Junior Kindergarten to Grade 5) on February 19, 2007. The Middle Years Programme (Grade 6 to Grade 10) authorization happened shortly after on March 6, 2007. The Diploma Program (Grade 11 and 12) was authorized on March 1, 2012.

As of August 2019 the Diploma Course offerings for students are:
 Biology: SL & HL
 Chemistry: SL & HL
 Physics: SL & HL
 Language & Literature: SL & HL
 French: SL & HL
 Spanish: SL, HL, & Ab-Initio
 Business Management: SL & HL
 History: SL & HL
 Human Geography: SL & HL
 Math Analysis and Approaches: SL & HL
 Math Applications and Interpretations: SL & HL
 Visual Arts: SL & HL
 Music: SL & HL

The first IB Diploma Program Cohort graduated in 2014.

University Acceptances
Meadowridge School frequently places its graduates in post-secondary institutions in Canada, the United States, and United Kingdom. The Class of 2017 had 4.5 acceptance offers per student with 100% of applicants receiving offers from a post-secondary institution.

Uniforms
Students at all levels are required to wear a school uniform. The school believes that uniforms provide a sense of inclusion, equality, and school pride and that students must identify and distinguish themselves through their behaviour rather than their appearance. There is a formal uniform, referred to as the #1, for Mondays, Fridays and special occasions. There is also an informal uniform, referred to as the #2 uniform, for general wear on Tuesday, Wednesday, and Thursdays.

There is a Physical Education uniform for Physical and Health Education classes as well as athletics and clubs. On Wednesdays, all of the Primary Years students wear their PE for uniform the entire day to provide a full day of activity without taking time to change uniforms. Each athletic team wears a uniform and jersey appropriate for the sport being played.
In 2017 a hooded sweatshirt was added to the #2 uniform option.

Students have options within the uniform so that they can select a combination that meets their comfort and personal style.

Athletics
Meadowridge offers a variety of athletic teams and clubs. Athletics clubs are offered for students in Kindergarten to Grade 12 and athletic teams are offered for students in Grade 4 to Grade 12. Meadowridge offers one of the largest fencing clubs in British Columbia and hosts an annual tournament that draws players from all over British Columbia and the northwest United States.

Meadowridge has earned provincial titles in Soccer, Water-Polo, Basketball, Volleyball, and Track & Field.

Athletic Teams & Clubs Offered:
 Soccer
 Basketball
 Volleyball
 Cross Country
 Swimming
 Track & Field
 Badminton
 Golf
 Fencing
 Fitness Club
 Running Club

Athletic Leagues:
 Independent Schools Association (ISA)
 Independent Schools Elementary Association (ISEA)
 Greater Vancouver Independent Schools Athletics Association (GVISAA)
 Fraser Valley Secondary Schools Athletics Association (FVSSAA)
 Maple Ridge Pitt Meadows Secondary Schools Athletics Association (MRPMSSAA)
 British Columbia School Sports (BCSS)

Student Life
Meadowridge offers a wide range of co-curricular activities to meet the interests of every student believing that inclusion of the arts and athletics plays an important role in a liberal education.

In athletics, Meadowridge offers a wide range of opportunities for students to get involved, not only as team members, but also as officials, support staff, and community coaches. All students at Meadowridge are supported in the attainment of the Duke of Edinburgh Award. Students in Grade 9 and 10 participate in the adventurous journey component of the award through the Outdoor Education Program. They optionally complete the other three components: service, skill development, and community service. Every student at Meadowridge is required to earn their Bronze Duke of Edinburgh Award.

House System
Meadowridge School is made up of four houses: Alouette (Blue), Kanaka (Red), Fraser (Green), and Whonnock (Orange). Each student, parent, and staff member belongs to one house. Competitions are held throughout the year for house points with two major Spirit Days happening at the beginning and end of the year. During Spirit Day, the four teams will compete against one another in various physical activities where house points are awarded for both success within the activities, as well as sportsmanship and house spirit. The day begins with the groups performing "house cheers", which are typically parodies of popular songs with added actions.

Previously, each house had a mascot character: Alouette an Alligator, Kanaka a Kodiak, Fraser a Falcon, and Whonnock a dragon. However, these were phased out for a variety of reasons.

The House with the most spirit points wins the House Cup at the end of the year.

Community service
Community service and outreach is an integral part of being a student at Meadowridge School. Service is encouraged at every grade and supports a number of local and international organizations including Cops for Cancer, Covenant House Vancouver, Matthew's House, Florida Wild Horse Rescue, ME to WE, BC Children's Hospital, Friends in Need Food Bank and the Terry Fox Foundation.

Students organize and manage a number of events, volunteer projects, and fundraisers throughout the year including a benefit concert, food hamper sorting, movie night, and awareness campaigns.

Meadowridge School students have written cards and letters of thanks that are "then delivered to local retirement communities and veterans" as part of a school-wide week of remembrance in November. In 2020 over 350 students sent out postcards, drawings, and letters.

Clubs and Activities
Meadowridge offers a wide variety of extra-curricular clubs: 

 Art
 Business Club
 Camping Skills
 Chess
 Colouring & Meditation
 Governance & Civic Mirror
 Knitting
 Model United Nations
 Silver-Smithing
 Teaching Drawing Skills
 Appreciation & Gratitude Writing
 Festival Choir
 Garden Club
 Global Citizenship Club
 Greenhouse Service
 Lego League Robotics
 Student-Initiated Service
 Yearbook
 Basketball Skills
 Field Games
 Fitness Club
 Girls Basketball 8–10
 Girls Volleyball
 Junior Boys Basketball
 Martial Arts
 Running
 Table Tennis
 Track & Field
 Ultimate Frisbee
 Reading Link
 Ready to Lead
 Musical
 Marimba
 Tennis
 Soccer Skills
 Sewing
 Storytelling Spelling
 PYP Buddies

Notable People

Jan Elsted and Crispin Elsted, Founders of Barbarian Press
Former teachers at Meadowridge School. Jan Elsted and 'Crispin Elsted founded Barbarian Press, a nationally awarded printing press company. They both retired from teaching at Meadowridge School to focus on Barbarian Press.

Greg Moore, Race Car Driver
Alumni of Meadowridge School 1985 to 1991. Greg Moore and his family were one of the founding families of Meadowridge School. He attended Meadowridge until Grade 10, which was the highest grade available at the time. The Greg Moore Foundation funds a scholarship at Meadowridge School, awarded to a graduating student each year.

A banner hangs in the school gymnasium in Moore's honour.

The actress and ballet dancer Sophia Reid-Gantzert studied at Meadowridge.

References

External links
Meadowridge School website 
Canadian Association of Independent Schools (CAIS)
Federation of Independent Schools Association of British Columbia
Our Kids: Meadowridge School Profile

Educational institutions established in 1985
High schools in British Columbia
Elementary schools in British Columbia
Private schools in British Columbia
Preparatory schools in British Columbia
Maple Ridge, British Columbia
1985 establishments in British Columbia
International Baccalaureate schools in British Columbia
International Baccalaureate schools in Canada